StepStone Group LP (StepStone) is a global private markets firm providing customized investment, portfolio monitoring and advice to investors. StepStone covers primary fund investments, secondary fund investments and co-investments across private equity, real estate, infrastructure and real assets, and private debt.

History
StepStone was founded in 2006 and is based in La Jolla, California and New York, New York.  The founders, Monte Brem and Thomas Keck had previously made private equity investments for Pacific Corporate Group, as President and Managing Director, respectively. From its first office in La Jolla, the firm has expanded to New York City, San Francisco, Cleveland, Toronto, Dublin, London, Luxembourg, Zurich, Beijing, Hong Kong, Seoul, Tokyo, Sao Paulo, Sydney, and Perth. The firm oversees over US$130 billion of private capital allocations, including over US$34 billion of assets under management.

In March 2015, it was published that StepStone would move its Manhattan headquarters to the former offices of Bernard L. Madoff Investment Securities, and the site of where company head Bernard Madoff operated his $65 billion Ponzi scheme. 

In 2012, StepStone appointed Mushin Kim as a partner in the Asian region and expanded its Korean office, and began to expand its investment in Asia in earnest.

In 2018, StepStone acquired Universum, a global company specializing in employer branding.

Investments

StepStone typically invests between $15 million and $200 million in firms with enterprise value between $150 million and $2.5 billion.

References

Financial services companies established in 2006
Private equity firms of the United States
Investment banking private equity groups
Companies based in New York City